Mary Alice Moore Connealy (born 1956) is an American author of Christian fiction who specializes in romantic comedy set in the cowboy era of the American west.

Early life 
Connealy was born in Oakland, Nebraska, and grew up on a farm in rural Lyons, Nebraska. She is the third of eight children of farmer and social worker Jackson Moore, and social worker and pianist Dorothy (Frew) Moore.

Connealy attended Jefferson School, a one-room country school house, for eight years during elementary school, and graduated from Lyons High School in 1974. She earned a Bachelor of Science degree in Mass Communications, graduating magna cum laude from Wayne State College, Wayne, Nebraska, in 1976.

Career 
Connealy wrote for ten years before she got her first book published, and had 20 finished books when she made her first sale. She published her first books with Barbour Publishing. After writing nineteen books for Barbour Publishing, she signed with Bethany House, a division of Baker Publishing Group, in 2011. Out of Control appeared on the Christian Booksellers Association national best-sellers list in September 2011 and also on the Evangelical Christian Publishers Association (ECPA) national fiction best-seller list. Connealy is also published by Thomas Nelson Publishing, a division of HarperCollins Publishers LLC. Connealy was a finalist for best first book in the American Christian Fiction Writer's (ACFW) 2008 Carol Awards with Petticoat Ranch. Doctor in Petticoats was a finalist for a 2011 RITA Award finalist-Best Inspirational Romance. Calico Canyon was a nominee for a Christy Award. Calico Canyon was best known for its opening line: "The Five Horseman of the Apocalypse rode in. Late as usual."

Selected published works 

Lassoed in Texas
Petticoat Ranch (Barbour Publishing, 2007) 
Calico Canyon (Barbour Publishing, 2008) 
Gingham Mountain (Barbour Publishing, 2009) 
Lassoed in Texas Trilogy – containing all three books (Barbour Publishing, 2010) 
Montana Marriage 
Montana Rose (Barbour Publishing, 2009) 
The Husband Tree (Barbour Publishing, 2009) 
Wildflower Bride (Barbour Publishing, 2010)  
Montana Marriage Trilogy – containing all three books (Barbour Publishing, 2011) 
Sophie's Daughters
Doctor in Petticoats (Barbour Publishing, 2010) 
Wrangler in Petticoats (Barbour Publishing, 2010) 
Sharpshooter in Petticoats (Barbour Publishing, 2011) 
Sophie's Daughters Trilogy – containing all three books (Barbour Publishing, 2011) 
Wild West Weddings
Cowboy Christmas (Barbour Publishing, 2009) 
Deep Trouble (Barbour Publishing, 2011) 
The Kincaid Brides series
Out of Control (Bethany House Publishing 2011) 
In Too Deep (Bethany House Publishing 2012) 
Over the Edge (Bethany House Publishing 2012) 
Trouble in Texas Series
Swept Away (Bethany House Publishing 2013) 
Fired Up (Bethany House Publishing 2013) 
Stuck Together (Bethany House Publishing 2014) 
Wild at Heart Series
Tried & True (Bethany House Publishing 2014) 
Now & Forever (Bethany House Publishing 2015) 
Fire & Ice (Bethany House Publishing 2015) 
Cimarron Legacy Series
The Boden Birthright (Bethany House Publishing 2016) ASIN: B01CRHOTJQ
No Way Up (Bethany House Publishing 2016) 
Long Time Gone (Bethany House Publishing 2017)  
Too Far Down (Bethany House Publishing 2017) 
High Sierra Sweethearts Series
The Accidental Guardian (Bethany House Publishing 2018) 
The Reluctant Warrior (Bethany House Publishing 2018)  
The Unexpected Champion (Bethany House Publishing 2019) 
Brides of Hope Mountain Series
Aiming for Love (Bethany House Publishing 2019) 
Woman of Sunlight (Bethany House Publishing 2020) 
Her Secret Song (Bethany House Publishing 2020) 
Brothers in Arms Series
Braced for Love (Bethany House Publishing 2021) 
A Man with a Past (Bethany House Publishing 2021) 
Love on the Range (Bethany House Publishing 2021) 
The Lumber Baron's Daughters Series
The Elements of Love (Bethany House Publishing 2022) 
Inventions of the Heart (Bethany House Publishing 2022) 
Model of Devotion (Bethany House Publishing 2022)

Garrison's Law Series (contemporary Romantic Suspense)
Loving the Texas Lawman (Amazon Digital Services LLC) 
Loving Her Texas Protector (Amazon Digital Services LLC) 
Loving the Texas Negotiator (Amazon Digital Services LLC) 
Loving the Texas Stranger (Amazon Digital Services LLC) 
Loving the Mysterious Texan (Amazon Digital Services LLC) 
Romantic Thriller
Ten Plagues: A Romantic Thriller (Amazon Digital Services, 2018) 

Novella Collections
Black Hills Blessing (Barbour Publishing, 2010) 
A Bride for All Seasons (Thomas Nelson Publishing 2013) 
Alaska Brides Collection (Barbour Publishing, 2013) 
A Match Made in Texas (Bethany House Publishing 2014) 
Four Weddings and a Kiss (Thomas Nelson Publishing 2014) 
The Homestead Brides Collection (Barbour Publishing 2015) 
12 Brides of Christmas (Barbour Publishing 2015)  
With This Ring? (Bethany House Publishing 2016)  
Lassoed by Marriage (Barbour Publishing 2016) 
12 Brides of Summer (Barbour Publishing 2017) 
The Calico and Cowboys Romance Collection: Love Is a Lighthearted Adventure in Eight Novellas from the Old West (Barbour Publishing 2017) 
Hearts Entwined: A Historical Romance Novella Collection by Mary Connealy/Karen Witemeyer/Regina Jennings/Melissa Jagears  
Three Christmas Novellas: Longhorn Christmas, The Sweetest Gift, The Christmas Candle (Amazon Digital Services LLC 2018) 
ebooks
Room at the Inn for Christmas (St. Martin's Press Swerve 2016) ASIN: B01JGMQDTO 
The Advent Bride (Shiloh Run Studios 2014) ASIN: B00NTI2YXG

Nosy in Nebraska 
Bury the Lead (Ten Talents Publishing 2011) ASIN: B007QO8RKS 
Fright at the Museum (Ten Talents Publishing 2011) ASIN: B007QOAZL2
Trial and Terror (Ten Talents Publishing 2011) ASIN: B007QOAYQ8
Ten Plagues: A Romantic Thriller (Amazon Digital Services, 2018)

Awards 
Romance Writer's of America Milestone Pin 50 books published
American Christian Fiction Writers (acfw.com) Milestone Pin 50 books published
 Genesis Award Winner 2004 Long Historical Romance-Petticoat Ranch—for unpublished manuscripts
 Genesis Award Finalist 2004 Long Historical Romance-Montana Rose—for unpublished manuscripts
 Carol award Winner 2008 Short Historical Romance– Golden Days
 Carol award Finalist 2008 Best First Book-Petticoat Ranch
 Christy Award Finalist 2009-Calico Canyon
 Carol Award Finalist—4 Time 2009 Best Long Historical Romance-Montana Rose, Two time Best Short Contemporary Romance-Buffalo Gal, Clueless Cowboy, Best Short Mystery-Of Mice...and Murder 
 Carol award winner 2010 Long Historical Romance -Cowboy Christmas 
 RITA Award finalist-Best Inspirational 2011 
 Carol Award Finalist Best Long Historical Romance 2011-The Husband Tree

References

External links 

 
 Seekerville—Blog for Aspiring Writers
 Real Live Petticoat Ranch-Personal Blog
 Bethany House Publishing books
Baker Book House
Good Reads Mary Connealy
Enterprise Hub Newspaper, Fremont, Nebraska
 Fremont Tribune, Fremont, Nebraska
 http://www.wpnews.com/wisner_news/local-author-gets-inspiration-from-research/article_ea1ffe92-a1df-11e6-bd94-abb1699461da.html
 http://www.wpnews.com/news/people/readers-share-books-at-john-a-stahl-library/article_bb8631e6-1e61-59a8-b853-c3da41fd1ca5.html
 https://katcountryhub.com/2014/08/26/author-mary-connealy-speaks-at-oakland-public-library/

1956 births
Living people
American romantic fiction novelists
Writers from Nebraska
American women novelists
American Western (genre) novelists
Women romantic fiction writers
People from Oakland, Nebraska
People from Lyons, Nebraska